Pedunculotheca is a genus of orthothecid hyolith known from the Chengjiang biota of China, notable for its possession of a pedunculate attachment structure likened to the brachiopod pedicle.

On account of this pedicle and its flattened larval shell, it is reconstructed as the earliest diverging hyolith, and a model for the ancestral morphology of this lineage of stem-group brachiopods.

References

Orthothecidae